Hsohsa is a village in Hsi Hseng Township, Taunggyi District, in the Shan State of eastern Burma. It is located northeast of the town of Loisawn. It is a primary agricultural village, with extensive fields around it. The village is named after Hso Hsa Hpa, a ruler of ancient Shan who was the son of Sao Pet Law.

References

External links
Maplandia World Gazetteer

Populated places in Taunggyi District
Hsi Hseng Township